The canton of Viriat is a former administrative division in eastern France. It was disbanded following the French canton reorganisation which came into effect in March 2015. It had 17,061 inhabitants (2012).

The canton comprised 6 communes:
Buellas
Montcet
Polliat
Saint-Denis-lès-Bourg
Vandeins
Viriat

Demographics

See also
Cantons of the Ain department

References

Former cantons of Ain
2015 disestablishments in France
States and territories disestablished in 2015